The African Renaissance Unity Party (ARU) is a South African political party founded to lobby for the interests of traditional chiefs and their communities. The party's leaders are all traditional chiefs.

At its launch, the party promised to reduce unemployment by 70%, double pensions and provide free tertiary education.

Controversy 
Party leader Bryce Mthimkhulu, who describes himself as King Mthimkhulu III and king of the amaHlubi nation in KwaZulu-Natal, was warned by then president Jacob Zuma in 2016 to stop using the term, and was taken to court by the government (which lost the case).

Election results

The party contested the 2019 general election at the national level, and provincial level in the Free State, Kwazulu-Natal and Limpopo, failing to win any seats.

National elections

|-
! Election
! Total votes
! Share of vote
! Seats 
! +/–
! Government
|-
! 2019
| 3,860
| 0.02%
| 
| –
| 
|}

Provincial elections

! rowspan=2 | Election
! colspan=2 | Eastern Cape
! colspan=2 | Free State
! colspan=2 | Gauteng
! colspan=2 | Kwazulu-Natal
! colspan=2 | Limpopo
! colspan=2 | Mpumalanga
! colspan=2 | North-West
! colspan=2 | Northern Cape
! colspan=2 | Western Cape
|-
! % !! Seats
! % !! Seats
! % !! Seats
! % !! Seats
! % !! Seats
! % !! Seats
! % !! Seats
! % !! Seats
! % !! Seats
|-
! 2019
| - || -
| 0.02% || 0/30
| - || -
| 0.04% || 0/80
| 0.03% || 0/49
| - || -
| - || -
| - || -
| - || -
|}

References

2017 establishments in South Africa
Political parties established in 2017
Political parties in South Africa